Tokio is a Volvo Ocean 60 yacht. She finished fifth in the W60 class of the 1993–94 Whitbread Round the World Race skippered by Chris Dickson.

References

Volvo Ocean Race yachts
Sailing yachts of Japan
Volvo Ocean 60 yachts
1990s sailing yachts
Sailboat type designs by Bruce Farr